Lleyton Hewitt was the defending champion but lost in the quarterfinals to Paradorn Srichaphan.

Kenneth Carlsen won in the final 7–6(8–6), 6–3 against Magnus Norman.

Seeds
The top eight seeds received a bye to the second round.

  Lleyton Hewitt (quarterfinals)
  Juan Carlos Ferrero (second round)
  Carlos Moyá (second round)
  Àlex Corretja (second round)
  Juan Ignacio Chela (third round)
  James Blake (second round)
  Nicolás Lapentti (second round)
  Paradorn Srichaphan (semifinals)
  Stefan Koubek (first round)
  Jan-Michael Gambill (first round)
  Dominik Hrbatý (second round)
  Agustín Calleri (second round)
  Wayne Arthurs (second round)
  Nicolás Massú (third round)
  David Ferrer (first round)
  Taylor Dent (third round)

Draw

Finals

Top half

Section 1

Section 2

Bottom half

Section 3

Section 4

References
 2002 AIG Japan Open Tennis Championships Draw

Singles